Several ships have born the name Orpheus after Orpheus, an Ancient Greek musician, poet and prophet:

  was launched at Chester in 1794. She made two voyages for the British East India Company (EIC). She also served briefly as a transport in two military campaigns, and traded with the West and East Indies. She was last listed in 1838 but may well have been sold for breaking up in 1828.
  was launched in 1818 and wrecked in 1827
  was renamed Orpheus c.1970

See also
 

Ship names